Gareth Lyn Powell (born 1970) is a British author of science fiction. He is the author of several novels, including Silversands, The Recollection, Ack-Ack Macaque, Hive Monkey, Macaque Attack, and Embers of War.

He has won the BSFA Award for Best Novel twice, for Ack-Ack Macaque in 2013 and Embers of War in 2019.  Ack-Ack Macaque also became a finalist of the 2016 Seiun Award for Best Translated Long Work.

Powell's short stories have appeared in a host of magazines and anthologies, including Interzone, Solaris Rising 3, and The Year's Best Science Fiction, and his story "Ride The Blue Horse" made the shortlist for the 2015 BSFA Award. Many of his shorter works have been brought together in the collections, The Last Reef (2008) and Entropic Angel (2017)

Born and brought up in the West Country, Powell studied humanities and creative writing at the University of Glamorgan (now the University of South Wales). He has given guest lectures on creative writing at Bath Spa University, Aberystwyth University and Buckingham New University and has written a series of non-fiction articles on science fiction for The Irish Times.

His first four novels were favourably reviewed in The Guardian by Eric Brown. His Embers of War series is currently being adapted into a television series, which will be directed by Breck Eisner.

Professional works

Powell's first book was a collection, The Last Reef and Other Stories. It compiles much of his short fiction from before 2008, including the Interzone reader's choice poll winner "Ack-Ack Macaque". A second collection, Entropic Angel, was made available for free download from Powell's website in 2013. It reprints "Distant Galaxies Colliding", "The Last Reef" and "Sunsets and Hamburgers" from the previous collection and adds "Entropic Angel", several novel excerpts and an essay.

Silversands was Powell's debut novel. It was initially produced in a run of three hundred hardcover copies and an ebook edition, featuring the additional short story "Memory Dust", was made available by Anarchy Books. The reception was mostly favourable, including reviews from Interzone and Eric Brown in The Guardian. Brown regarded the novel as a "fine hi-tech romp" but was critical of what he called "a rushed and melodramatic dénouement."

The Recollection is the second novel by Powell. The novel received mostly favourable reviews, including reviews from Locus and Powell's second review from Eric Brown in his column in The Guardian. Brown said that the novel's set-pieces were "brilliantly realised" and that the book balanced its high concepts with the human story. He ended his review with "If you read only one space opera this year, it's got to be The Recollection".

In January 2013, Powell released his third novel via Solaris Books, Ack-Ack Macaque, based on the short story of the same name. A sequel, Hive Monkey, followed in 2014. The third volume of the trilogy, Macaque Attack, was released in January 2015.

Titan Books published his sixth novel Embers of War in 2018. A sequel, Fleet of Knives, followed in 2019; the trilogy was concluded with Light of Impossible Stars in 2020.

Achievements

In 2013, his alternate history thriller, Ack-Ack Macaque won the British Science Fiction Association (BSFA) Award for Best Novel and was a finalist in the best translated long work category for the 2016 Seiun Award in Japan.

Embers of War won the BSFA Award for Best Novel in 2019, and was a finalist for the Locus Award for Best Science Fiction Novel.

Bibliography

Novels

 Silversands (Pendragon Press, 2010)
 The Recollection (Solaris Books, 2011)
 Ack-Ack Macaque (Solaris Books, 2012)
 Hive Monkey  (Solaris Books, 2014)
 Macaque Attack (Solaris Books, 2015)
 Embers of War (Titan Books, 2018)
 Fleet of Knives (Titan Books, 2019)
 Light of Impossible Stars (Titan Books, 2020)
Light Chaser (Tor.com, 2021), with Peter F. Hamilton
Stars and Bones: A Continuance Novel (Titan Books, 2022)

Novellas

Ragged Alice (Tor.com, 2019)

Short story collections
 The Last Reef and Other Stories (Elastic Press, 2008)

Short stories
 "Red Lights, And Rain" - Solaris Rising 3 (2014)
 "This is How You Die" - Interzone 251 (March 2014)
 "Ack-Ack Macaque: Indestructible" - 2000 AD (December 2012)
 "Biz Be Biz" (with Paul Graham Raven) - Colinthology (October 2012)
 "Another Apocalypse" - Solaris Rising 1.5 (August 2012)
 "Railroad Angel" - Interzone 241 (July 2012)
 "Eleven Minutes" - Interzone 231 (July 2011) (also on StarShipSofa #225)
 "The New Ships" - Further Conflicts (Newcon Press, 2011)
 "Entropic Angel" - Dark Spires (Wizard's Tower Press, 2010)
 "The Bigger The Star, The Faster It Burns" - 2020 Visions (M-Brane Press) (available as a PDF file)
 "Fallout" - Conflicts (Newcon Press, 2010)
 "The Church of Accelerated Redemption" (with Aliette de Bodard) - Shine (Solaris Books, April 2010)
 "Gonzo Laptop" - Hub Magazine (January 2010)
 "What Would Nicolas Cage Have Done?" - Future Bristol (Swimming Kangaroo Books, April 2009) (also available as an audio file on Dark Fiction Magazine)
 "Memory Dust" - Interzone (January 2009). Included in the ebook edition of Silversands.
 "Flotsam" - The Last Reef and Other Stories (Elastic Press, August 2008). Set in the same milieu as "The Last Reef" and "Hot Rain".
 "Arches" - The Last Reef and Other Stories (Elastic Press, August 2008). Elements of this story were later incorporated into The Recollection.
 "Hot Rain" - The Last Reef and Other Stories (Elastic Press, August 2008). A story expanding on an incident mentioned in "The Last Reef".
 "Falling Apart" - The Last Reef and Other Stories (Elastic Press, August 2008). A dark, entropic, near future story set in a decaying Weston-super-Mare.
 "The Long Walk Aft" - Illuminations (Odd Two Out Press, April 2008) (Also on Powell's website.) Collected in The Last Reef and Other Stories.
 "Coffee House" - Illuminations (Odd Two Out Press, April 2008)
 "Fresh Meat" - Illuminations (Odd Two Out Press, April 2008)
 "Lost Toys" - Illuminations (Odd Two Out Press, April 2008)
 "Natalie" - Illuminations (Odd Two Out Press, April 2008)
 "Snowball" - Illuminations (Odd Two Out Press, April 2008)
 "Thai Curry" - Illuminations (Odd Two Out Press, April 2008)
 "The Point Furthest From The Sun" - Illuminations (Odd Two Out Press, April 2008)
 "The Winding Curve" (with Rob Starr) - Sophistry By Degrees (Stonegarden.net, January 2008)
 "The Redoubt" - Aphelion (December 2007). A first person narrative telling of the memories of one of the last humans alive. Reprinted in The Last Reef and Other Stories.
 "Pod Dreams of Tuckertown" - Byzarium (October 2007). Collected in The Last Reef and Other Stories.
 "A Necklace of Ivy" - Fiction Online (September 2007). A rewritten version of a 1995 short story. Also in The Last Reef and Other Stories.
 "Ack-Ack Macaque" - Interzone (September 2007) (An audio version is found on Transmissions From Beyond). Winner of the 2007 Interzone reader's poll for best short story. It will be incorporated into a novel of the same name, Powell's third. Collected in The Last Reef and Other Stories.
 "The Kitten Box" - Aphelion's (November 2005). Later retitled as "Cat in a Box" in The Last Reef and Other Stories. Part of Aphelion's "Mare Inebrium" setting.
 "Dear Colleague" - Quantum Muse (April 2006)
 "The Last Reef" - Interzone (February 2006) (Reprinted on Best SF.). Powell's first Interzone sale, a story featuring the technical concept of a machine that can be used to transform its user. Reprinted in The Last Reef and Other Stories.
 "Sunsets and Hamburgers" - Byzarium (January 2006). This was an experimental story based around the concept of Transrealism. Also collected in The Last Reef and Other Stories.
 "Six Lights off Green Scar" - Aphelion (April 2005) (Archived on Infinity Plus). A story featuring starship pilots engaging in the sport of "random-jumping" via hyperdrives into unknown areas of space. Elements of this story were later incorporated into The Recollection. Also collected in The Last Reef and Other Stories.
 "Distant Galaxies Colliding" - Quantum Muse (February 2005) (Archived on Infinity Plus). Elements of this story were later incorporated into The Recollection. Also collected in The Last Reef and Other Stories.
 "Jaguars Falling From The Sky" -  Quantum Muse (July 2004)
 "Catch A Burning Star" - Aphelion (April 2004). Later revised as "Morning Star" for The Last Reef and Other Stories.
 "Tranquility" - TANK Magazine (2002)
 "Providence" - TANK Magazine (2002)

Non-fiction
 About Writing (Luna Press, 2019)

References

External links
 Gareth L. Powell's personal website
 
 Story Behind Hive Monkey - Online Essay by Gareth L. Powell

Living people
1970 births
21st-century English novelists
Alumni of the University of Glamorgan
English male novelists
21st-century English male writers
British science fiction writers